The Johnny Cash Family Christmas is the 41st overall and second Christmas album by country singer Johnny Cash, released on Columbia Records in 1972. It is his second Christmas album, the first one being the 1963 release entitled The Christmas Spirit. The album includes less original Cash material than its predecessor and contains narrations and dialogue featuring his family and friends, between tracks. In all, three songs were written or co-written by Cash, while two, "Christmas as I Knew It" and "Silent Night", had been featured on The Christmas Spirit ("Silent Night" would, in fact, be featured on all four Johnny Cash Christmas albums). June Carter Cash, Marshall Grant, Tommy Cash, Harold Reid, Larry Butler (who was both Cash's piano player and record producer at this time), Maybelle Carter, Anita Carter, Carl Perkins and Lew DeWitt are among those featured on the album.

Track listing

Personnel
Johnny Cash - vocals, actor, guitar
 Marshall Grant - bass, actor
 WS Holland - drums
 Bob Wootton – electric guitar
 Carl Perkins – vocals, actor, electric guitar
 Ray Edenton, Jerry Hensley, Jimmy Young - guitar
 Norman Blake - guitar, banjo
 Wayne Grey - mandolin
 Charles Cochrane - piano
 Larry Butler - keyboards, actor
 Gary Gorsett - drums
 Farrell Morris - percussion
 The Carter Family - vocals
 The Statler Brothers – vocals
June Carter, Tommy Cash, Harold Reid, Maybelle Carter, Anita Carter, Lew DeWitt - actors
Technical
Charlie Bragg, Mike Figlio, Roger Tucker - engineer
Bill Barnes - art direction
Mabey Trousdell - cover illustration

External links
Luma Electronic entry on The Johnny Cash Family Christmas

Johnny Cash albums
1972 Christmas albums
Christmas albums by American artists
Columbia Records Christmas albums
Albums produced by Larry Butler (producer)
Country Christmas albums